Belgium competed at the 1992 Summer Olympics in Barcelona, Spain. 68 competitors, 43 men and 25 women, took part in 70 events in 18 sports.

Medalists

Competitors
The following is the list of number of competitors in the Games.

Archery

Veteran Paul Vermeiren was the only Belgian archer to compete in the nation's sixth appearance in the modern Olympic archery tournament.  He won his first elimination match, but was then defeated by the eventual silver medallist.

Men's Individual Competition:
 Paul Vermeiren — Round of 16, 12th place (1-1)

Athletics

Men's 5.000 metres
Vincent Rousseau
 Heat — did not start (→ did not advance)

Men's 10.000 metres
Vincent Rousseau
 Heat — 29:25.68 (→ did not advance)

Men's 50 km Walk
Godfried De Jonckheere — DSQ (→ no ranking)

Women's 10.000 metres
Lieve Slegers
 Heat — 32:40.59
 Final — 32:14.17 (→ 15th place)
Veronique Collard
 Heat — did not finish (→ did not advance)

Badminton

Boxing

Canoeing

Cycling

Seven cyclists, six men and one woman, represented Belgium in 1992. Cédric Mathy won bronze in the men's point race.

Men's road race
 Wim Omloop → Did not finish
 Erwin Thijs → Did not finish
 Michel Vanhaecke → Did not finish

Men's sprint
 Erik Schoefs

Men's 1 km time trial
 Tom Steels

Men's individual pursuit
 Cédric Mathy

Men's points race
 Cédric Mathy

Women's road race
 Kristel Werckx — 2:05:03 (→ 15th place)

Women's individual pursuit
 Kristel Werckx

Diving

Men's 3m Springboard
Alexei Kogalev
 Preliminary Round — 323.46 points (→ did not advance, 26th place)

Equestrianism

Gymnastics

Judo

Rhythmic gymnastics

Rowing

Sailing

Men's Sailboard (Lechner A-390)
Paul Vandenabeele
 Final Ranking — 170.0 points (→ 15th place)

Women's Sailboard (Lechner A-390)
Christ'l Smet
 Final Ranking — 179.0 points (→ 15th place)

Shooting

Swimming

Men's 50m Freestyle
 Marc Verbeeck
 Heat – 24.85 (→ did not advance, 53rd place)

Men's 100m Freestyle
 Marc Verbeeck
 Heat – 52.97 (→ did not advance, 48th place)

Men's 200m Freestyle
 Stefaan Maene
 Heat – 1:51.85 (→ did not advance, 24th place)

Men's 100m Backstroke
 Yasuhiro Vandewalle
 Heat – 56.20
 B-Final – 56.36 (→ 9th place)
 Stefaan Maene
 Heat – 56.34
 B-Final – 56.47 (→ 10th place)

Men's 200m Backstroke
 Stefaan Maene
 Heat – 1:59.64
 Final – 2:00.91 (→ 8th place)
 Yasuhiro Vandewalle
 Heat – 2:01.46 
 B-Final – 2:02.45 (→ 14th place)

Men's 100m Breaststroke
 Frédérik Deburghgraeve
 Heat – 1:05.10 (→ did not advance, 34th place)

Men's 200m Breaststroke
 Frédérik Deburghgraeve
 Heat – 2:16.93 (→ did not advance, 19th place)

Men's 200m Individual Medley
 Stefaan Maene
 Heat – 2:06.16 (→ did not advance, 24th place)

Men's 4 × 100 m Medley Relay
 Yasuhiro Vandewalle, Frédérik Deburghgraeve, Stefaan Maene, and Marc Verbeeck
 Heat – 3:47.64 (→ did not advance, 16th place)

Women's 200m Freestyle
 Isabelle Arnould
 Heat – 2:04.06 (→ did not advance, 20th place)
 Sandra Cam
 Heat – 2:04.72 (→ did not advance, 25th place)

Women's 400m Freestyle
 Isabelle Arnould
 Heat – 4:13.81
 Final – 4:13.75 (→ 6th place)
 Sandra Cam
 Heat – 4:17.87
 B-Final – 4:14.11 (→ 10th place)

Women's 800m Freestyle
 Isabelle Arnould
 Heat – 8:40.86
 Final – 8:41.86 (→ 8th place)
 Sandra Cam
 Heat – 8:50.91 (→ did not advance, 14th place)

Women's 100m Breaststroke
 Brigitte Becue
 Heat – 1:12.82 (→ did not advance, 21st place)

Women's 200m Breaststroke
 Brigitte Becue
 Heat – 2:34.11 (→ did not advance, 17th place)

Women's 200m Individual Medley
 Brigitte Becue
 Heat – 2:21.98 (→ did not advance, 25th place)

Table tennis

Tennis

Wrestling

References

Nations at the 1992 Summer Olympics
1992
Olympics